Sarah Levy (born September 10, 1986) is a Canadian actress best known for her role of Twyla Sands in Schitt's Creek.

Early life
Levy is the daughter of actor Eugene Levy and Deborah Divine, and the sister of actor Dan Levy. She graduated from Branksome Hall and studied theatre at Dalhousie University. Her father is Jewish and her mother is Protestant.

Career
One of Levy's earliest film roles was in Larry Crowne. She also had a minor part in Adam Shankman's Cheaper by the Dozen 2, in which her father appeared. Her most notable role was Twyla Sands on Schitt's Creek, where she co-starred with her father and brother as a waitress at the local café. According to Dan, working with Sarah and their father brought the family closer. In 2020, Variety announced that Sarah Levy was joining the cast of the Chris Blake quarantine comedy Distancing Socially. It was shot at the height of the Covid-19 pandemic in 2020, using remote technologies and the iPhone 11. It was acquired and released by Cinedigm in October 2021.  

Sarah and her father portray themselves in the current Capital One Auto ad campaign for its automobile-shopping app.

Personal life
Levy married actor Graham Outerbridge in October 2021. On July 5, 2022, she announced on Instagram that she and her husband had welcomed a son.

Filmography

References

External links

1986 births
21st-century Canadian actresses
Canadian television actresses
Canadian people of Bulgarian-Jewish descent
Canadian people of Polish-Jewish descent
Canadian people of Scottish-Jewish descent
Dalhousie University alumni
Living people
Jewish Canadian actresses